A leap year starting on Thursday is any year with 366 days (i.e. it includes 29 February) that begins on Thursday 1 January, and ends on Friday 31 December. Its dominical letters hence are DC. The most recent year of such kind was 2004 and the next one will be 2032 in the Gregorian calendar or, likewise, 2016 and 2044 in the obsolete Julian calendar.

Any leap year that starts on Monday, Wednesday or Thursday has two Friday the 13ths: those two in this leap year occur in February and August. 

In this leap year, Martin Luther King Jr. Day is on January 19; Valentine's Day is on a Saturday; Presidents' Day is on February 16; the leap day is on a Sunday; Saint Patrick’s Day is on a Wednesday; Memorial Day is on its latest possible date, May 31; Juneteenth is on a Saturday; U.S. Independence Day and Halloween are on a Sunday; Labor Day is on September 6; Thanksgiving is on November 25; and Christmas is on a Saturday.

Calendars

Applicable years

Gregorian Calendar 
Leap years that begin on Thursday, along with those that start on Monday or Saturday, occur least frequently: 13 out of 97 (≈ 13.402%) total leap years in a 400-year cycle of the Gregorian calendar. Their overall occurrence is 3.25% (13 out of 400).

For this kind of year, the corresponding ISO year has 53 weeks, and the ISO week 10 (which begins March 1) and all subsequent ISO weeks occur earlier than in all other years, and exactly one week earlier than common years starting on Friday, for example, June 20 falls on week 24 in common years starting on Friday, but on week 25 in leap years starting on Thursday, despite falling on Sunday in both types of year. That means that moveable holidays may occur one calendar week later than otherwise possible, e.g. Gregorian Easter Sunday in week 17 in years when it falls on April 25 and which are also leap years, falling on week 16 in common years.

400 year cycle

century 1: 4, 32, 60, 88

century 2: 128, 156, 184

century 3: 224, 252, 280

century 4: 320, 348, 376

Julian Calendar 
Like all leap year types, the one starting with 1 January on a Thursday occurs exactly once in a 28-year cycle in the Julian calendar, i.e. in 3.57% of years. As the Julian calendar repeats after 28 years that means it will also repeat after 700 years, i.e. 25 cycles. The year's position in the cycle is given by the formula ((year + 8) mod 28) + 1).

References 

Gregorian calendar
Julian calendar
Thursday